Abala may refer to:

Places
 Abala, Benin
 Abala, Congo, a district in the Republic of the Congo
 Abala, Nigeria, a town in Nigeria
 Abala, Niger, a town in Niger
 Abala, Ethiopia, a town in Ethiopia
 Abala (woreda), a district in Ethiopia named after this town
 Tabala (Lydia), an ancient settlement and bishopric in Lydia

Other uses
 Abala (film), a 1973 film